Kamen-Rybolov is a rural locality (a selo) and the administrative center of Khankaysky District of Primorsky Krai, Russia, located on the shores of Lake Khanka. Population:

History
It was founded by peasants who migrated from the western regions of Russia (modern day Belarus) and by the Cossacks in 1865.

References

Notes

Sources

Rural localities in Primorsky Krai